The chapters of the mystery manga series Arisa were written and illustrated by Natsumi Ando. The series appeared as a serial in Kodansha's monthly shōjo (targeted towards girls) manga magazine Nakayoshi from the February 2009 issue to the September 2012 issue. Kodansha has collected the chapters into twelve bound volumes and published them from April 28, 2009, to September 6, 2012.

North American publisher Del Rey announced in September 2009 to have the series licensed for North America. Del Rey released the first volume, but shortly after Kodansha announced that they would be taking over from Del Rey on a case to case basis. On December 12, 2010, Kodansha Comics officially announced that they would be continuing Arisa in North America starting in May 2011.



Volume List

References

Arisa